The 2015 African Amateur Boxing Championships were held at the Mohammed V Athletic Center in Casablanca, Morocco from 18 to 23 August 2015. It was the 18th edition of this event organised by the African governing body for amateur boxing, the African Boxing Confederation (AFBC).

Schedule

Medal winners

Medal table
Below is the final medal table from the championships. The event was dominated by Morocco and Algeria, with the two nations combining to win nine of the ten available gold medals. Morocco won the most gold medals, with five, as well as the most total medals, with eight.

References

External links
 Full match results at amateur-boxing.strefa.pl
 2015 AFBC African Confederation Boxing Championships at AIBA.org

2015
Boxing
African Boxing Championships
Boxing
African Amateur Boxing Championships
21st century in Casablanca
Sport in Casablanca